Heartcore may refer to:
Heartcore (Kurt Rosenwinkel album), 2003
Heartcore (Wildbirds & Peacedrums album), 2007